Ali Arab may refer to:
 Ali Arab, Isfahan
 Ali Arab, Khuzestan

See also
 Arab Ali